The Limerick Desmond League is an association football league featuring amateur, junior, youth and under-17 teams from the part of County Limerick west of the N20. Its top division, the Premier Division, is a seventh level division in the Republic of Ireland football league system. Desmond is a historical name associated with both Limerick and Munster.

History
The league was founded in January 1955 following a meeting at the Desmond Castle, Newcastle West. It was agreed to call the league – the Desmond League  and its founding members included – Killonan F.C., Newcastle West A.F.C., Tralee Dynamos and A.F.C. Askeaton. These four teams contested the first league championship which was won by Killonan. In it early years the league also included teams from County Kerry. In 1966 Joe Wickham initiated reforms that helped modernize the league and by 1969 it featured twenty teams. In 1971 Tralee Dynamos and Killarney Athletic left the Desmond League to become founder members of the Kerry District League.

Recent seasons has seen the number of teams affiliated to the league and as a result, the number of divisions. The 2018/19 season saw the league reduced to three divisions (Premier Division, Division One, Division Two). The league has also seen a couple of club mergers. Killeany AFC merged with Bally Rovers to form Killeany/Bally Rovers FC, Newcastle West Rovers and Newcastle West AFC merged to form Newcastle West Town. Adare United and Kilcornan merged at underage but at junior level AK United and Adare United remain separate entities.

On the pitch Chris Smith of Abbeyfeale United, Daniel Power and Mark Doherty if Newcastle West A.F.C have represented the Republic of Ireland amateur level, while Broadford United Youths and Newcastle West Rovers youths have reached a Munster Youths Cup semi-final, something which the league hasn't regularly seen.

In 2019/20, just three divisions of ten teams affiliated.  Ferry Rangers, Ballysteen, Feenagh, Rockhill Rovers and Killeaney/Bally Rovers all withdrew from junior football. Mountcollins and a number of B teams took their place.

The league also entered the Oscar Traynor Trophy after a number of years absence.

2015–16 teams

List of winners by season

Notes

References

External links
  ldfl.leaguerepublic.com

Association football in County Limerick
7
Association football leagues in Munster